The President of the United Republic of Tanzania is the head of state and head of government of the United Republic of Tanzania. The President leads the executive branch of the Government of Tanzania and is the commander-in-chief of the Tanzania People's Defence Force. The President serves a term of five years. Since 1992, they are limited to two terms, whether successive or separated.

Samia Suluhu Hassan, sworn in on 19 March 2021, is the first female president of the United Republic of Tanzania. She succeeded John Magufuli following his death on 17 March 2021.

Executive powers 
The president of Tanzania is the Commander-in-Chief of the Armed Forces and is "accountable to a legislature composed of elected members and representative of the people."

List

After its independence in 1961 as Tanganyika, the country was first led by Sir Richard Turnbull as governor-general until Julius Nyerere became the first and only president under the 1962 constitution. The 1964 constitution after the merger of Tanganyika and Zanzibar has had 6 presidents with each serving multiple terms except Samia Suluhu Hassan. Julius Nyerere served 5 terms total from 1962–1985, having served 4 terms under the 1964 constitution. All presidents of Tanzania have been from the Tanganyika African National Union party which later merged to become the Chama Cha Mapinduzi party.

Latest election

See also

Tanzania
Politics of Tanzania
List of governors of Tanganyika
List of heads of state of Tanzania
Prime Minister of Tanzania
List of prime ministers of Tanzania
List of Sultans of Zanzibar
President of Zanzibar
List of heads of government of Zanzibar
Lists of office-holders

References

 
1964 establishments in Tanzania